Orgest Buzi (born 20 September 1994 in Fier) is an Albanian professional footballer who plays for Apolonia Fier in the Albanian First Division after several years with Bylis Ballsh.

References

1994 births
Living people
Sportspeople from Fier
Association football defenders
Albanian footballers
KF Bylis Ballsh players
KF Himara players
FK Dinamo Tirana players
KS Sopoti Librazhd players
KF Apolonia Fier players
Kategoria Superiore players
Kategoria e Parë players